Modest Boguszewski (born 8 January 1963) is a Polish footballer. He played in two matches for the Poland national football team in 1987.

References

External links
 

1963 births
Living people
Polish footballers
Poland international footballers
Sportspeople from Lublin
Association football defenders
Motor Lublin players
Śląsk Wrocław players
Stal Mielec players
Siarka Tarnobrzeg players
Radomiak Radom players
KS Lublinianka players
Avia Świdnik players
Chełmianka Chełm players
20th-century Polish people